KBRD (680 AM) with 24 hour service at FM 101.1 is a non-commercial, listener-supported radio station broadcasting a Nostalgia format licensed to Lacey, Washington, United States. The station is currently owned by BJ & Skip's for the Music. The foundation is a 501(c)3 organization, so donations are tax deductible. It is dedicated to the preservation of the music of the first half of the 20th century. AM 680 is a daytimer station, signing on at sunrise and signing off at local sunset to protect KNBR in San Francisco, California.

History
The station was assigned the call letters KNTE on March 7, 1994. On October 7, 1994, the station changed its call sign to KLDY then again on February 17, 1995, to the current KBRD.

Larry "Skip" Morrow owned an FM radio station but was interested in also owning an AM station.  When he purchased what was to become KBRD, there wasn't enough radio equipment to go on the air. He was also interested in the KBRD call letters; when the station was ready to go on the air, they belonged to someone else, so the station signed on under his ownership as KLDY.  When KBRD became available, Morrow transferred the KLDY callsign to his classical AM station at 1280, making 680 KBRD.

KBRD was named for BJ, Morrow's Moluccan cockatoo. who was the "music director".  If BJ danced to the music, it was put on KBRD's playlist. Morrow ran both KBRD and his FM radio station from his living room. Ten years after KBRD went on the air, Larry Morrow died of cancer; before his death, he transferred ownership of the radio station to a foundation he created: BJ and Skip's for The Music Foundation.  The station is run by Adrian DeBee (music) and Jack Ondracek (engineering).

Format
Although officially described as a "nostalgia" station, KBRD plays an eclectic mixture of jazz, rock, swing, country, dixieland, ragtime, zydeco, western swing, novelty and other music, much of which can be heard nowhere else in the country.  A typical hour broadcast on KBRD might contain music by Artie Shaw, Aunt Dinah's Quilting Party, Bessie Smith, Boots Randolph, Clicquot Club Eskimos, Captain Stubby and the Buccaneers, Bing Crosby, the Harmonicats, Sheb Wooley, Marty Robbins, Jelly Roll Morton, Nat King Cole, the Korn Kobblers, George Formby, Nana Mouskouri, Perry Como, Merle Travis, Louis Armstrong and the ever-popular Hoosier Hot Shots.  KBRD broadcasts without commercial interruption.

Awards
The KBRD website states that the station was named the 9th best radio station in the country by E! Entertainment .

Listening online

References

External links

Nostalgia radio in the United States
BRD
Radio stations established in 1994
Lacey, Washington
1994 establishments in Washington (state)
BRD